Mopane, Colophospermum mopane, is a tree in the legume family that grows in southern Africa.

Mopane may also refer to: 
 Guibourtia coleosperma, the false mopane, a tree species
 Gonimbrasia belina, the mopane worm, a butterfly species
 Plebeina armata, the mopane bee, a bee species

See also 
 Mopani (disambiguation)